Frances Ynez Johnston (May 12, 1920 – 2019) was an American painter, sculptor, printmaker and educator. Her artwork is modernist and abstract with a narrative of imaginative lands or creatures, and often featuring collage. Johnston was based in Los Angeles.

Biography 
Johnston was born on May 12, 1920, in Berkeley, California. She attended University of California, Berkeley to study with Worth Ryder and received her bachelor of fine arts in 1941 and her masters of fine arts in 1947. Between 1940 and 1943, Johnston lived in Mexico after receiving a grant from UC Berkeley, this cultivated an appreciation for travel throughout her life.

In 1960 she married novelist and poet, John Berry. In the years following she produced prints through Tamarind Lithography Workshop.

Johnston started teaching art classes at various universities and colleges in 1950 and ended teaching in 1980. She began at University of California, Berkeley (1950–1951) and then continued her teaching career at  Colorado Springs Fine Art Center (1954–1955), Chouinard Art Institute (1956), California State College (1966–1967, 1969, 1973), the University of Jerusalem (1967), and Otis Art Institute of Parsons School of Design (1978–1980). 

Her work is featured in various permanent collections including the Museum of Modern Art (MoMA), the Whitney Museum of American Art, the Metropolitan Museum of Art, the Smithsonian American Art Museum, the Art Institute of Chicago, the Los Angeles County Museum of Art (LACMA), the Spencer Museum of Art, the National Gallery of Art, Fullerton College, the McNay Art Museum, the University of Michigan Museum of Art, the Indianapolis Museum of Art, and others. She died in 2019.

Awards 
Johnston was awarded a Guggenheim Fellowship in 1952 for fine art, which allowed her travel to Italy. In 1955–1956 she was awarded the Louis Comfort Tiffany Foundation grant for painting and printmaking. Johnston was awarded the National Endowment for the Art (NEA) grant in 1976 and 1986.

References

1920 births
2019 deaths
20th-century American painters
20th-century American printmakers
20th-century American women artists
21st-century American women artists
American women printmakers
Artists from Los Angeles
National Endowment for the Arts Fellows
University of California, Berkeley alumni
American expatriates in Mexico
Artists from Berkeley, California